Edward Crosby Johnson II (January 19, 1898 – April 2, 1984) was an American businessman and lawyer who founded Fidelity Investments.

“A Boston Brahmin, Mr. Johnson was born Edward Crosby Johnson 2d in a townhouse on Beacon street, Back Bay, on Jan. 19, 1898, the son of Samuel Johnson, a partner in a leading dry-goods firm C.F. Hovey and Co. and Josephine (Forbush) Johnson.”
Johnson came from a family of New England Puritan ancestry. He graduated from Milton Academy, Harvard College and Harvard Law School and became involved in stock market research in 1924.

Johnson applied to have the Fidelity Fund approved in May 1930; John C. Hull, Securities Director of Massachusetts, approved the Fidelity Fund May 1, 1930 as an investment trust of the general management type. Officers were E. C. Johnson, 2d., Pres., E. C. Johnson, 2nd — Vice-Pres. & Treas. It became Fidelity Investments. During the Great Depression in the United States the "Fidelity Fund" was the only fund approved by Hull.

In 1946, he founded Fidelity Management and Research, and he served as its chairman. He died in Cataumet, Massachusetts of Alzheimer's disease in 1984, and his funeral was held at Milton's Universalist First Parish Church.

References

External links
"Fidelity Investments Inc History"
 https://www.findagrave.com/memorial/169558995/edward-crosby-johnson
 https://www.encyclopedia.com/social-sciences-and-law/economics-business-and-labor/businesses-and-occupations/fmr-corp
Moody's Manual of Investments - 1944 Edition  - FIDELITY FUND 1930 - page 754
Moody's Manual of Investments, American and Foreign, Banks, insurance companies, investment trusts, real estate, finance and credit companies
Fidelity Fund, Inc. Incorporated in Massachusetts May 1, 1930. as an investment trust of the general management type. Officers: E. C. Johnson, 2d., Pres., R. B. Williams. Treas.; Gwen Shannon, Clerk and Asst. Treas. Directors (Showing banking and corporate connections): E. C. Johnson, 2nd — Vice-Pres. & Treas., Incorporated Investors. G. R. Harding — Trustee. P. H. Theopold— Dir., Fiduciary Trust Co., Boston. Annual Meeting: Third Monday in February. Custodian of Securities: National Shawmut Bank of Boston.  
https://www.govinfo.gov/content/pkg/GPO-CRECB-1933-pt1-v77/pdf/GPO-CRECB-1933-pt1-v77-19.pdf

1898 births
1984 deaths
Businesspeople from Boston
Harvard University alumni
Milton Academy alumni
American company founders
American chairpersons of corporations
Neurological disease deaths in Massachusetts
Deaths from Alzheimer's disease